Mirinae is a subfamily of plant bugs, insects in the family Miridae.

Tribes
 Herdoniini
 Hyalopeplini
 Mecistoscelini
 Mirini
 Restheniini
 Scutelliferini
 Stenodemini

References 

 
Hemiptera subfamilies